Arnadi is a village in Cyprus, located north of Famagusta. It is under the de facto control of Northern Cyprus.

References

Communities in Famagusta District
Populated places in İskele District